Chha Maya Chhapakkai is a 2019 Nepali Social-comedy film directed by Dipendra Lama and produced by Rohit Adhikari of Rohit Adhikari Films. Writer of this film is Deepak Raj Giri. The film stars Deepak Raj Giri, Keki Adhikari, Kedar Ghimire and Jeetu Nepal. Actor Deepak Raj Giri even was awarded National Film Awards for the Best-actor

The film was formally announced in April 2019. The film was shot extensively across Nepal, The film's soundtrack and background score are composed by Basanta Thapa Choreographed by Kabi Raj, and Gahat Raj editing by Bipin Malla. Suman Giri is the film's production designer whilst Deepa Shree Niraula became the advisor of the director and screenplay by Deepak Raj Giri also Executive producers were Kedar Ghimire and Jeetu Nepal.

This film was made on a budget of रू 80-90 Lakh (US$73 thousand), The film was released theatrically on 11 October 2019 and opened to positive reviews from the critics with praise for the performances and screenplay. With रू 1.06 Crore (US$86 thousand) worldwide on its first day, The film grossed over रू 9.4 Crore  (US$767 thousand) worldwide, making it the third highest-grossing Nepali film of 2019, and set several other box office records for a Nepali film, including the 11 highest-grossing Nepali of film.

Cast

Special Appearances:
 Barsha Raut as Goli Kancha's wife
 Buddhi Tamang in the song "Junko Juneli"
 Rajani Gurung in the song "Junko Juneli"

Music

References